Tzipora "Tzipi" Obziler (born 19 April 1973) is an Israeli former professional tennis player.

She reached her career-high singles world ranking of No. 75 in on 8 July 2007, and career-high doubles ranking of No. 149 on 10 April 2000.

In Federation Cup, she is a shared world record holder for most ties played, at 61.

Early and personal life
She was born in Givatayim, Israel, and is Jewish.

Obziler speaks Hebrew and English. After graduating from high school, she served two years in the Israel Defense Forces (IDF; the Israeli Army). Obziler attended classes at Old Dominion University in Norfolk, Virginia.

She and her girlfriend Hadas have a daughter together. Obziler took a break from professional tennis when the baby was born, and came back to play in 2008.

Tennis career
She won 14 singles and 14 doubles titles on the ITF Women's Circuit. Despite her late run, she played her best tennis over the last few years and qualified for several Grand Slam events.

She started playing tennis at age 10, with friends. In 1997, she won ITF tournaments in singles in Jaffa and Antalya. In 1998, she repeated in Jaffa. In 1999, she won in Guimaraes and Azemeis (both Portugal), and two tournaments in Istanbul, Turkey. In 2000, she won tournaments in Ashkelon and Beersheba in Israel.

In 2002, she won in Mumbai, India, and Nonthaburi, Thailand. In November, she defeated world No. 62, Emmanuelle Gagliardi of Switzerland, in France. In 2003 in India, she had an upset win over world No. 36, Elena Likhovtseva of Russia, in straight sets.

In 2004, she played world No. 1, Justine Henin-Hardenne, in the US Open, winning a set but losing in the second round. In 2005, she won both the singles and doubles (with Shahar Pe'er) titles in Raanana, Israel. She also upset world No. 47, Émilie Loit of France, in the Australian Open in two sets.

In 2006, she managed to get further than round two of a WTA Tour event in her first events of the year at Auckland and at Guangzhou in late September. At the Auckland Open, she reached the quarterfinals with two good wins over Jamea Jackson and the fifth-seeded world No. 27, Katarina Srebotnik of Slovenia, before falling to Daniela Hantuchová. In Guangzhou, she reached semifinals of the tournament, along the way defeating world No. 51, Elena Vesnina of Russia, and world No. 20, Li Na of China, before falling to the fourth-seeded Anabel Medina Garrigues in three sets.

Other than that, she qualified for the Australian Open and various WTA Tour events, she won an ITF title in Washington, D.C., and finally an ITF doubles title in Antalya-Manavgat partnering Romina Oprandi.

In 2007, she beat 56th-ranked Aiko Nakamura of Japan in the round of 16 of the Pattaya City tournament in Thailand. She also made it to the semifinals in Bangalore and Patras. In August at the US Open, she lost in the first round to world No. 86, Caroline Wozniacki of Denmark. On 30 September 2007, she reached her first final on the WTA Tour, in which she lost to Virginie Razzano at the Guangzhou International Women's Open.

She represented Israel at the 2008 Summer Olympics in Beijing, in both singles and (with Shahar Pe'er) doubles.

On 13 August 2009, Obziler convened a press conference to announce her retirement from professional tennis.

Federation Cup
Obziler was 48–30 in Federation Cup matches for the Israel Fed Cup team between 1994 and 2007, including wins in 12 of her most recent 13 matches. 
Obziler was part of Israel's Federation Cup team that won 10 ties in a row to reach the competition's quarterfinals in 2008 – Israel's greatest Federation Cup achievement in history. Obziler currently holds the world record for most Federation Cup Ties Played, at 61. She shares the record with compatriot Anna Smashnova.

WTA career finals

Singles: 1 (runner-up)

ITF Circuit finals

Singles (14–11)

Doubles (14–13)

See also
 List of select Jewish tennis players

References

External links
 

1973 births
LGBT Jews
Israeli LGBT sportspeople
Living people
Jewish tennis players
Israeli female tennis players
People from Givatayim
Olympic tennis players of Israel
Old Dominion University alumni
Tennis players at the 2008 Summer Olympics
Israeli Jews
LGBT tennis players
Ono Academic College alumni